Santa Fe de Ralito is a small ranching outpost in Córdoba Department, Colombia.  It was also the home base for the former leader of the AUC, Salvatore Mancuso, as well as other leaders and 400 of their bodyguards. As part of the late 2004 demobilizations, these people were given a temporary 142 square mile (368 km2) haven in Santa Fe de Ralito. While the AUC leaders remained in this area, they were not subject to arrest warrants. Colombian authorities and security forces could enter and leave Santa Fe de Ralito at will, but paramilitary leaders required government authorization to do so. This haven ceased to exist as such between late 2005 and early 2006, as the demobilizations came to an end.

References
Presidencia de Colombia -  INFORME DE LA ZONA DE UBICACIÓN EN SANTA FÉ DE RALITO, CÓRDOBA

United Self-Defense Forces of Colombia